Emre Torun (born 2 June 1993) is a Turkish footballer who plays for Fethiyespor.

Career
He made his Süper Lig debut for Antalyaspor against Kayserispor on 27 August 2012.

References

External links
 
 
 
 
 Emre Torun at eurosport.com
 Emre Torun at goal.com
 

1993 births
Living people
People from Altındağ, Ankara
Turkish footballers
Turkey youth international footballers
Antalyaspor footballers
Çaykur Rizespor footballers
1461 Trabzon footballers
Tokatspor footballers
1922 Konyaspor footballers
Eyüpspor footballers
Süper Lig players
TFF First League players
TFF Second League players
Association football forwards